is a near-Earth asteroid of the Atira group. It also has the largest value of the relativistic perihelion shift, 1.6 times that of Mercury.

Discovery 
 was discovered by astronomer Scott Sheppard using the Dark Energy Survey's DECam imager at Cerro Tololo Observatory in Chile on 13 August 2021, two days after the asteroid had reached aphelion (its furthest distance from the Sun.) The observations were conducted at twilight to search for undiscovered minor planets situated at low elongations from the Sun. It was then reported to the Minor Planet Center's Near-Earth Object Confirmation Page under the temporary designation v13aug1. The object was then provisionally designated  by the Minor Planet Center and announced on 21 August 2021. Even in April 2021, the asteroid was never more than 45 degrees from the Sun.

These observations were published by the Minor Planet Center on 10 October 2021.

Orbit and classification 

 orbits the Sun at a distance of 0.13–0.79 AU once every 4 months (114 days; semi-major axis of 0.46 AU). Its orbit has an eccentricity of 0.71 and an inclination of 32 degrees with respect to the ecliptic. It is classified as a near-Earth object (NEO) due its perihelion distance being less than 1.3 AU. It also falls under the NEO category of Atira asteroids, whose orbits are confined entirely within Earth's orbit at 1 AU from the Sun. Its orbit crosses the paths of Mercury and Venus, with nominal minimum orbit intersection distances of 0.11 AU and 0.015 AU, respectively.

,  holds the record for the smallest semi-major axis (0.46 AU) and shortest orbital period (114 days) of any known asteroid, supplanting  and 594913 ꞌAylóꞌchaxnim (0.56 AU, 151 days). For comparison, Mercury has a semi-major axis of 0.39 AU and an orbital period of 88 days. The relativistic perihelion shift of this object is 1.6 times that of Mercury, which is 42.9 arcseconds per century.

Nonetheless, additional observations are necessary to constrain uncertainties in its orbit by the time the asteroid approaches perihelion and enters conjunction with the Sun in October 2021, during which it will become unobservable at solar elongations less than 20 degrees. It currently comes closer to Venus than to any of the other planets. Deep close encounters with Venus control its long-term orbital evolution. As with many other Atira asteroids, it is subjected to the von Zeipel-Lidov-Kozai secular resonance.

Physical characteristics

Temperature
At perihelion  is heated up to temperatures of over 1000 K. Due to the resulting temperature differences between 's lit-up and shadowed areas, thermal shock is theorized to have caused numerous surface fractures on the asteroid.

See also 
 Vulcanoids, a hypothetical population of asteroids within Mercury's orbit
 , low semi-major axis Atira asteroid
 , another low semi-major axis Atira asteroid
 594913 ꞌAylóꞌchaxnim, the first asteroid discovered that always stays within Venus' orbit

Notes

References

External links 
 Record breaking Atira recently discovered, 2 September 2021, NEO Coordination Centre, European Space Agency
 
 

Minor planet object articles (unnumbered)
Discoveries by Scott S. Sheppard
20210813